WVEM-LP (100.5 FM) is a radio station licensed to serve Stanley, North Carolina.  The station is owned by Voice of Evangelism Cathedral Inc. It airs a Southern Gospel music format.

The station was assigned the WVEM-LP call letters by the Federal Communications Commission on April 12, 2004.

WVEM-LP is currently temporarily off the air under a "remain silent authority" issued by the FCC. On February 25, 2008, the station was granted an extension to this authority to remain silent until no later than July 25, 2008.

References

External links
 
WVEM-LP service area per the FCC database

VEM-LP
Southern Gospel radio stations in the United States
Radio stations established in 2005
Gaston County, North Carolina
VEM-LP